St John the Baptist's Church is an Anglo-Catholic parish church in Leamington Spa, England. The historic structure is Grade II* listed.

History 

The church of St John the Baptist was built between 1877 and 1878 to designs by the architect John Cundall of Leamington.

It was recently reroofed at a cost of £250,000 by Brown Matthews Architects.

It is a parish of the Society of St Wilfrid and St Hilda under the care of the Bishop of Ebbsfleet.

Organ

The church has a two-manual pipe organ built by Henry Jones which dates from 1878. A specification of the organ can be found on the National Pipe Organ Register.

Organists

1880–1888: Richard Yates Mander

References

Gothic Revival church buildings in England
Leamington, St John the Baptist
Leamington, St John the Baptist
Buildings and structures in Leamington Spa
Leamington, St John the Baptist
Leamington Spa